Ronald Joseph DeFeo Jr. (September 26, 1951 – March 12, 2021) was an American mass murderer who was tried and convicted for the 1974 killings of his father, mother, two brothers, and two sisters in Amityville, Long Island, New York. Condemned to six sentences of 25 years to life, DeFeo died in prison on March 12, 2021. The case inspired the book and film versions of The Amityville Horror.

Murders
Around 6:30p.m. on November 13, 1974, DeFeo, who was then 23, entered Henry's Bar in Amityville, Long Island, New York, and declared: "You got to help me! I think my mother and father are shot!" DeFeo and a small group of people went to 112 Ocean Avenue, which was located near the bar, and found that DeFeo's parents were dead inside the house. One of the group, DeFeo's friend Joe Yeswit, made an emergency call to the Suffolk County Police Department, who searched the house and found that six members of the family were dead in their beds.

The victims were Ronald Jr.'s parents: Ronald DeFeo Sr. (43) and Louise DeFeo (née Brigante, 43); and his four siblings: Dawn (18), Allison (13), Marc (12), and John (9). All of the victims had been shot with a .35 caliber lever action Marlin 336C rifle around three o'clock in the morning of that day. The DeFeo parents had both been shot twice, while the children had all been killed with single shots. Physical evidence suggests that Louise DeFeo and her daughter Allison were awake at the time of their deaths. According to Suffolk County Police, the victims were all found lying face down in bed. The DeFeo family had occupied 112 Ocean Avenue since purchasing it in 1965. The six victims were later buried in Saint Charles Cemetery nearby in Farmingdale.

Ronald DeFeo Jr., also known as "Butch", was the eldest child of the family and its lone surviving member. He was taken to the local police station for his own protection after suggesting to police officers at the scene of the crime that the killings had been carried out by a mob hit man, Louis Falini. However, an interview at the station soon exposed serious inconsistencies in his version of events. The following day, he confessed to carrying out the killings himself; and Falini, the alleged hitman, had an alibi proving he was out of state at the time of the killings. DeFeo told detectives: "Once I started, I just couldn't stop. It went so fast". He admitted that he had taken a bath and redressed, and detailed where he had discarded crucial evidence such as blood-stained clothes, the Marlin rifle and cartridges before going to work as usual.

Trial and conviction
DeFeo's trial began on October 14, 1975. He and his defense lawyer, William Weber, mounted an affirmative defense of insanity, with DeFeo claiming that he killed his family in self-defense because he heard their voices plotting against him. The insanity plea was supported by the psychiatrist for the defense, Daniel Schwartz. The psychiatrist for the prosecution, Dr. Harold Zolan, maintained that, although DeFeo was a user of heroin and LSD, he had antisocial personality disorder and was aware of his actions at the time of the crime. The trial's judge, Thomas Stark, declared that DeFeo's crimes were "the most heinous murders committed in Suffolk County since its founding."

On November 21, 1975, DeFeo was found guilty on six counts of second-degree murder. On December 4, 1975, Judge Thomas Stark sentenced DeFeo to six sentences of 25 years to life.

DeFeo was held at the Sullivan Correctional Facility in the town of Fallsburg, New York, and until his death all of his appeals and requests to the parole board had been denied.

Controversies
All six of the victims were found face down in their beds with no signs of a struggle. The police investigation concluded that the rifle had not been fitted with a sound suppressor and found no evidence of sedatives having been administered. DeFeo claimed during his interrogation that he had drugged his family. 

DeFeo had a volatile relationship with his father, but the motive for the killings remains unclear. He asked police what he had to do in order to collect on his father's life insurance, which prompted the prosecution to suggest at trial that his motive was to collect on the life insurance policies of his parents.

After his conviction, DeFeo gave several varying accounts of how the killings were carried out. In a 1986 interview for Newsday, DeFeo claimed his sister Dawn killed their father and then their distraught mother killed all of his siblings, apparently with a rifle before he killed his mother. He stated that he took the blame because he was afraid to say anything negative about his mother to her father, Michael Brigante Sr., and his father's uncle, out of fear that they would kill him. His father's uncle was Peter DeFeo, a caporegime in the Genovese crime family. In this interview, DeFeo also asserted he was married at the time of the murders to a woman named Geraldine Gates, with whom he was living in New Jersey, and that his mother phoned to ask him to return to Amityville to break up a fight between Dawn and their father. Subsequently, he drove to Amityville with Geraldine's brother, Richard Romondoe, who was with him at the time of the murders and could verify his story completely.

In 1990, DeFeo filed a 440 motion, a proceeding to have his conviction vacated. In support of his motion, DeFeo asserted that Dawn and an unknown assailant, who fled the house before he could get a good look at him, killed their parents and Dawn subsequently killed their siblings. He said the only person he killed was Dawn and that it was by accident as they struggled over the rifle. Again, he asserted he was married to Geraldine and that her brother was with him at the time of the murders. An affidavit from Richard Romondoe was submitted to the court and it was asserted he could not be located to testify in person. Evidence was submitted to the court by the Suffolk County District Attorney's Office suggesting that Richard Romondoe did not exist and that Geraldine Gates was living in upstate New York married to someone else at the time of the murders. Geraldine Gates did not testify at this hearing because the authorities had already confronted her about the false claims and in 1992 secured a statement under oath where she admitted Romondoe was fictitious and that she did not actually marry DeFeo until 1989 in anticipation of the filing of the 440 motion.

Judge Stark denied the motion, writing, "I find the testimony of the defendant overall to be false and fabricated. His testimony that during the fall of 1974 he was married and lived with his wife and child at Long Branch, New Jersey is incredible and not worthy of belief. He produced no corroborating evidence in this regard... another reason for my disbelief of defendant's testimony is demonstrated by consideration of several portions of the trial testimony... he signed a lengthy written statement describing in detail his activities... in this statement he said that he lived with his family at 112 Ocean Avenue in Amityville and that he worked for his father... that he usually went to and from work with his father; that he was ill and stayed home from work on November 12, 1974; that he was on probation for having stolen an outboard engine and had an appointment to see his probation officer in Amityville on that very afternoon... defendant's girlfriend, Mindy Weiss, testified that she began dating the defendant in June 1974, and was with him frequently that summer and fall". Stark further declared, "Defendant's testimony that he did not shoot and kill the members of his family is likewise incredible and not worthy of belief".

On November 30, 2000, DeFeo met with Ric Osuna, the author of The Night the DeFeos Died, which was published in 2002. According to Osuna they spoke for about six hours. However, in a letter to the radio show host Lou Gentile, DeFeo denied giving Ric Osuna information that could be used in his book, claiming that he immediately left the interview and did not speak to Osuna about anything substantive.

According to Osuna, DeFeo claimed that he had committed the murders with his sister Dawn and two friends, Augie Degenero and Bobby Kelske, "out of desperation" because his parents had plotted to kill him. Allegedly, DeFeo claimed that, after a furious row with his father, he and his sister planned to kill their parents and that Dawn murdered the children in order to eliminate them as witnesses. He said that he was enraged on discovering his sister's actions, knocked her unconscious on to her bed and shot her in the head. Police found traces of unburned gunpowder on Dawn's nightgown, which DeFeo proponents allege proves she discharged a firearm. However, at trial, the ballistics expert, Alfred Della Penna, testified that unburned gunpowder is discharged through the muzzle of a weapon, indicating that she was in proximity to the muzzle of the weapon when it was discharged and not that she fired the weapon. He reiterated this on an A&E Amityville documentary that is extensively discussed in Will Savive's Mentally Ill In Amityville. Savive had an expert evaluate Della Penna's assessment and the expert confirmed that he was correct. Moreover, the medical examiner found nothing to indicate that Dawn had been in a struggle; the bullet wound was the only fresh mark on her body.

Skeptic Joe Nickell notes that given the frequency with which DeFeo has changed his story over the years, any new claims from him regarding the events that took place on the night of the murders should be approached with caution.

Most of the claims made in Ric Osuna's book are sourced to DeFeo's ex-wife, Geraldine Gates. While in the 1986 interview with Newsday, she asserted she married DeFeo in 1974, in Osuna's book, she alleges they married in 1970. Their 1993 divorce case says that they met in 1985, married in 1989, and divorced in 1993.

Death
DeFeo died aged 69 on March 12, 2021, at the Albany Medical Center. The official cause of death has not been released to the public.

In popular culture

 Jay Anson's book The Amityville Horror was published on September 13, 1977. The book is based on the 28-day period during December 1975 and January 1976 when George and Kathy Lutz and their three children became the first family to live at 112 Ocean Avenue since the murders. The Lutz family left the house, claiming that they had been terrorized by paranormal phenomena while living there. The book's 1979 film adaptation became the highest-grossing independent film of all time and held that record until 1990. It was followed by several sequels, as well as many other films which share no connection other than the reference to Amityville.
 The 1982 film Amityville II: The Possession is based on the book Murder in Amityville by parapsychologist Hans Holzer. It is set at 112 Ocean Avenue, featuring the fictional Montelli family, who are based on the DeFeo family. The story introduces speculative and controversial themes, including an incestuous relationship between Sonny Montelli and his teenage sister Patricia, based loosely on a rumor of an incestuous relationship between DeFeo and his sister Dawn.
 The 2018 film The Amityville Murders is another dramatization of the DeFeo murders and the circumstances surrounding them; unlike Amityville II: The Possession, the 2018 film retains the names of the real-life participants. Diane Franklin and Burt Young, who starred in Amityville II, appear in different roles in The Amityville Murders.
 The film versions of the DeFeo murders contain several inaccuracies. The 2005 remake of The Amityville Horror contains a fictional child character called Jodie DeFeo. The claim that DeFeo was influenced to commit the murders by spirits from a Lenape burial ground on the site of 112 Ocean Avenue has been rejected by local historians and Native American leaders, who argue that there is insufficient evidence to support the claim that the burial ground ever existed.

References

External links

 The Amityville Files - Collection of Amityville materials
 Transcript of 911 emergency call to Suffolk County Police reporting the shootings.

1951 births
2021 deaths
1974 mass shootings in the United States
20th-century American criminals
American mass murderers
American murderers of children
American people convicted of murder
American people of Italian descent
American people who died in prison custody
Criminals from New York City
Crimes in New York (state)
Crimes on Long Island, New York
Familicides
Mass murder in 1974
Mass murder in the United States
Mass shootings in the United States
Murder in New York (state)
People convicted of murder by New York (state)
People from Amityville, New York
People from Brooklyn
People from Long Island
Prisoners sentenced to life imprisonment by New York (state)
People with antisocial personality disorder
Prisoners who died in New York (state) detention
The Amityville Horror